Jean Baptiste Dockx (24 May 1941 – 15 January 2002) was a Belgian international footballer. He played for Mechelen, Racing White and Anderlecht, and for the Belgium national team in the 1970 FIFA World Cup and the 1972 UEFA European Football Championship. He was later a manager, and was caretaker manager of Anderlecht in 1999.

On 15 January 2002, Dockx died unexpectedly at the age of 60 from a traumatic aortic rupture. Anderlecht paid a lot of attention to his death and praised him as one of the most valuable players the club had ever had.

In 2005 he was nominated for the title De Grootste Belg (The Greatest Belgian), but did not make it to the final nomination list. He ended up in place 401 of those who fell outside the final nomination list.

Honours

Club 
Mechelen
 Belgian Second Division: 1962–63

Anderlecht
 Belgian First Division: 1971–72, 1973–74
 Belgian Cup: 1971–72, 1972–73, 1974–75, 1975–76
 Belgian League Cup: 1973, 1974
 European Cup Winners' Cup: 1975–76, 1976–77 (runners-up), 1977–78
 European Super Cup: 1976
 Amsterdam Tournament: 1976
Tournoi de Paris: 1977
 Jules Pappaert Cup: 1977
 Belgian Sports Merit Award: 1978

International 

UEFA European Championship: 1972 (third place)

References

External links

1941 births
2002 deaths
People from Sint-Katelijne-Waver
Belgian footballers
Belgian football managers
Belgium international footballers
Belgian Pro League players
1970 FIFA World Cup players
UEFA Euro 1972 players
R.W.D. Molenbeek players
R.S.C. Anderlecht players
R.W.D. Molenbeek managers
Royal Antwerp F.C. managers
R.S.C. Anderlecht managers
Association football midfielders
K.V. Mechelen players
Footballers from Antwerp Province